Stegasta postpallescens is a moth of the family Gelechiidae. It was described by Walsingham in 1897. It is found in the West Indies, where it has been recorded from Grenada and Cuba.

The wingspan is about 9 mm. The forewings are brownish fuscous, sparsely sprinkled with ochreous scales. A creamy-ochreous dorsal streak occupies one-third the width of the wing and runs from the base through the tornal cilia and a small creamy-ochreous costal spot lies at one-fourth from the apex, and a few pale ochreous scales are visible at the base of the brownish-fuscous terminal cilia. The hindwings are grey.

References

Moths described in 1897
Stegasta